Coelosia is a genus of flies belonging to the family Mycetophilidae.

The genus was first described by Winnertz in 1863.

The genus has almost cosmopolitan distribution.

Species
Coelosia tenella (Zetterstedt, 1852)

References

Mycetophilidae